David Lamar McDonald (September 12, 1906 – December 16, 1997) was an admiral in the United States Navy, who served as the 17th Chief of Naval Operations from 1 August 1963 to 1 August 1967 during the Vietnam War era.

Early life and education
McDonald was born in Maysville, Georgia, on September 12, 1906. He originally sought to go to the United States Military Academy, receiving a nomination from Representative Thomas Montgomery Bell of the 9th Congressional District. After learning he was 2 months and 12 days too young, he opted to attend Riverside Military Academy first, then entered the United States Naval Academy, graduating in 1928.

Naval career
Before becoming a naval aviator, McDonald was assigned to the battleship  and the battleship . He spent three years, from 1935 to 1938, as a flight instructor at Naval Air Station Pensacola in Pensacola, Florida. Between 1938 and 1955, he served as flag secretary of the aircraft command of the United States Atlantic Fleet, commander of the Naval Operational Training Command, executive officer of the aircraft carrier  in the Pacific and assistant chief of staff for operations of the United States Pacific Fleet.

During the mid-1950s, McDonald commanded the aircraft carrier . In the early 1960s, before becoming Chief of Naval Operations, he served as Commander, United States Sixth Fleet. At the time of his selection as Chief of Naval Operations, he was the youngest full admiral in the navy, and had only received his fourth star a month prior.

While serving as the Chief of Naval Operations, he denounced the cover-up surrounding the USS Liberty incident: “I think that much of this is extraneous and it leaves me with the feeling that we’re trying our best to excuse the attackers…Were I a parent of one of the deceased this release would burn me up. I myself do not subscribe to it.”

In 1976, nearly a decade after he retired, McDonald wrote in his autobiography of his participation in the escalation of the Vietnam War:

The airfield at Naval Station Mayport, Florida, is named after McDonald.

Awards
Navy Distinguished Service Medal with gold star
Legion of Merit
Bronze Star Medal with "V" device
Navy Commendation Medal with "V" device and gold star
Presidential Unit Citation with bronze star
American Defense Service Medal with "A" device
American Campaign Medal
Asiatic-Pacific Campaign Medal with one silver and one bronze star
World War II Victory Medal
Navy Occupation Medal
National Defense Service Medal with star
Philippine Liberation Medal with two stars

References

External links

 Photo of McDonald as Commander, Sixth Fleet – from the Naval Historical Center 
 USS Coral Sea Commanding Officers – from USS Coral Sea Tribute Site
 1963 interview with McDonald

1906 births
1997 deaths
Military personnel from Georgia (U.S. state)
United States Navy admirals
United States Naval Academy alumni
Chiefs of Naval Operations
United States Navy personnel of the Vietnam War
Recipients of the Navy Distinguished Service Medal
Recipients of the Legion of Merit
People from Maysville, Georgia